is a Japanese gravure idol, tarento, and actress. Tejima is represented with To-Win, and later Platinum Production.

Publications

Videos

Filmography

TV series

Informational and variety

Dramas

Advertisements

Films

Radio

Internet programmes

Mobile

Video games

Direct-to-video

Stage

Bibliography

Photo albums

Magazines

Serialisations

Notes

References

External links
 

Japanese gravure models
Japanese actresses
Japanese radio personalities
1982 births
Living people
Actors from Tochigi Prefecture